Kalkowshavand, also rendered as Kalkoshavand, may refer to:
 Kalkowshavand-e Olya
 Kalkowshavand-e Sofla
 Kalkowshavand-e Vosta